Filiz Ali (born 30 September 1937) is a Turkish pianist and musicologist.

She studied piano at the State Conservatory of Music in Ankara. Graduating from Ferhunde Erkin's class in 1958, she received a Fulbright scholarship to study in the United States. Ali completed her studies at the New England Conservatory of Music in Boston, MA, where she studied with David Barnett, and at the Mannes College of Music in New York City with Frank Sheridan. She holds a degree in Advanced Musical Studies from King's College London where she was a Chevening Scholar.

Filiz Ali was the head of the Musicology Department of Mimar Sinan University in Istanbul between 1990 and 2005, also founder and director of Ayvalık International Music Academy since 1998. She produced music programmes for the Turkish Radio and Television Corporation from 1962 to 1995 and has been the regular music critique for major daily newspapers including Cumhuriyet, Hürriyet, Yeni Yüzyıl and Radikal.

She was the founding Artistic Director of the CRR Concert Hall in Istanbul between 1989 - 1992. Ali has been the Musical Advisor of the International Eskişehir Festival since 1995, and Director of the Ayvalık International Music Academy (AIMA).

She is a member of Balkan Music Forum, Turkish representative of the International Music Council and European Music Council.
She is the author of seven books on music and musicians.

She is the daughter of the famous author Sabahattin Ali (1907–1948)

Awards 
 Chevalier de L'Ordre des Arts et des Lettres Medal (1995 – France Culture Ministry)
 Vehbi Koç Awards (2011)
 43. Istanbul Music Festival Honorary Award (2015)

References

1937 births
Living people
Alumni of King's College London
Turkish scientists
Turkish musicologists
Turkish classical pianists
Turkish women pianists
Cumhuriyet people
Hürriyet people
Yeni Yüzyıl people
Radikal (newspaper) people
21st-century classical pianists
21st-century women pianists
Chevening Scholars
Fulbright alumni